Connector enhancer of kinase suppressor of ras 1 is an enzyme that in humans is encoded by the CNKSR1 gene.

Function 

This gene is a necessary element in receptor tyrosine kinase pathways, possibly as a tyrosine phosphorylation target.  It is involved in regulation of RAF in the MAPK pathway and may also play a role in a MAPK-independent pathway.

Interactions 

CNKSR1 has been shown to interact with RhoD and RASSF1.

References

Further reading

External links